Beam Invader is a fixed shooter released in arcades in 1979 by Tekunon Kougyou. It is one of several clones of Space Invaders which was released the previous year, with only the sprites for the UFO and player-controlled cannon altered.

Unlike the original, this game uses a paddle as the controller rather than a joystick or left/right buttons.

References

1979 video games
Arcade video games
Arcade-only video games
Fixed shooters
Video game clones
Video games developed in Japan